The Best of Jim Reeves is a compilation album by Jim Reeves, released in 1964 on RCA Victor.

The album spent eight weeks on the top of the Billboard country albums chart in August–September 1964 and four weeks at number 3 in the UK in February–March 1965.

Track listing

Charts

Awards and nominations

Notes

References 

1964 compilation albums
Jim Reeves albums
RCA Victor compilation albums